Khaliq Glover popularly known as  Khaliq-O-Vision, is a Grammy award winning recording mix engineer, producer and the author of Secrets: How The Stars Make Music IRRESISTIBLE!. Khaliq is the recipient of the 2001 Grammy Award for M² (album) by Marcus Miller under the Best Contemporary Jazz Album. He pursued his education in music at Dick Grove School Of Music.

Career
Glover started his career in 1982 when he began working as a recording and mixing engineer. Khaliq worked for Lion Share Studios under Kenny Rogers for four years and in 1987, he joined Wings West Studios, where Khaliq worked under Jeffrey Osborne. He also worked with Dave Hampton - MATK Corporation as an Engineering Consultant and founded Khaliq-O-Vision Music the same year.

In 2002, Glover joined Hancock Music, where he worked for Herbie Hancock at his home studio as a mixing engineer for two years. From 2004 to 2007, he worked for Prince at Paisley Park Studios as a recording and mixing engineer.

In 2007, Glover started providing independent pro audio and pro video services in the entertainment industry. In 2013, Khaliq founded the Music Mixing Success Bootcamp, a two-day live mixing event for singers, songwriters, musicians, producers, and engineers, held at the Sheraton-Gateway LAX Hotel.

Throughout his career, Glover worked with multiple artists such as  Michael Jackson, Lionel Richie, Stevie Wonder, Ray Charles, Bruce Springsteen, Bob Dylan, Diana Ross, John Mayer, Christina Aguilera, Justin Timberlake, Brian Eno, Smokey Robinson, Jeffrey Osborne, B2K, Narada Michael Walden, Kenny Lattimore, Thelonious Monk Institute of Jazz and others.

Discography

References

Grammy Award winners
Living people
Year of birth missing (living people)